Christopher Richard James Foster (born 7 November 1953) is a retired Anglican bishop who served as Bishop of Portsmouth in the Church of England from 2010 to 2021.

Early life
Foster was born on 7 November 1953. He was educated at Durham University where he held the position of Chapel Clerk at University College. He studied for ordination at Westcott House, Cambridge.

Career
Foster was made a deacon on St Peter's Day (29 June) 1980 and ordained a priest the following Petertide (28 June 1981) – both times by Kenneth Skelton, Bishop of Lichfield, at Lichfield Cathedral – and began his ordained ministry with a curacy in Tettenhall Regis in Wolverhampton, after which he became chaplain of Wadham College, Oxford. Following this he was vicar of Christ Church Southgate and finally a canon residentiary and sub-dean at St Albans Cathedral.

On 21 October 2001, he was consecrated a bishop by George Carey, Archbishop of Canterbury, at Southwark Cathedral, to serve the Diocese of St Albans as suffragan Bishop of Hertford. In February 2010, it was announced that Foster would be the new Bishop of Portsmouth. He was enthroned on 18 September 2010.

On 13 December 2020, he announced that he would be retiring as Bishop of Portsmouth from April 2021. His retired on 24 April 2021.

Views

Welfare reform
Foster has spoken out against the Conservative government's changes to the welfare state and austerity measures. In October 2015, he called proposed cuts to tax credits "morally indefensible":

Personal life
Foster's first wife died in 2001; they have two adult children. He married his second wife, Sally, in 2006.

Styles
 The Reverend Christopher Foster (1981–1994)
 The Reverend Canon Christopher Foster (1994–2001)
 The Right Reverend Christopher Foster (2001–present)

References

1953 births
Alumni of University College, Durham
21st-century Church of England bishops
Bishops of Hertford
Bishops of Portsmouth (Anglican)
Lords Spiritual
Living people